Lepidopleurus inquinatus is a small species of chiton in the family Leptochitonidae, endemic to New Zealand.

References
 Powell A. W. B., New Zealand Mollusca, William Collins Publishers Ltd, Auckland, New Zealand 1979 

Leptochitonidae
Chitons of New Zealand
Chitons described in 1847